The Adrar  (Berber for "mountain") is a highland natural and historical region of the Sahara Desert in northern Mauritania. The Adrar Region, an administrative division of Mauritania, is named after the traditional region. It is sometimes called Adrar Tamar to distinguish it from other areas called Adrar in the Sahara.

Geography
The Adrar is an arid plateau, known for its gorges, regs (stony deserts) and sand dunes. Limited cultivation is only possible in the gorges at lower elevations such like oued Seguellil where the water table is high enough to support large palm groves.

Notable features include the Oued el Abiod or 'White Valley', a dune-filled fault line along which many small settlements and palm groves are found. The Guelb Aouelloul crater is 3.1 million-old impact crater which was studied by the noted Saharan scholar Théodore Monod. To the east beyond Ouadane is the distinctive Richat Structure, an uplifted and then heavily eroded dome of strata approximately 40 km across and whose concentric rings resemble an impact crater when observed from space.

The Adrar region is home to a small human population, centered on the town of Atar. The ancient town of Ouadane, formerly an important caravan and gold-trading centre, is located towards the eastern edge of the Adrar. Chinguetti is another important historical town in the region.

History
The Adrar was settled in the Neolithic era as shown by cave and rock paintings found in the area such as the Agrour Amogjar. The more recent aridification has left much of the archaeology intact, most notable several stone circles, e.g. Atar Stone Circle, and the later town of Azougui.

Beginning in the mid-17th century, migrants from the Adrar Plateau region moved into the Tagant Plateau and displaced the native population.

Features of the Adrar

See also
 Geography of Mauritania

References

External links
UNESCO: "Ancient Ksour of Ouadane, Chinguetti, Tichitt and Oualata"
The Adrar - Lonely Planet
Map of the Adrar - Bab Sahara

Landforms of Mauritania
Plateaus of Africa
Geologic formations with imbedded sand dunes
Serer history
Geologic formations of Africa
Natural regions of Africa
Historical regions